Eddie Cochran Great Hits is the sixth album posthumously released in the US after Eddie Cochran's death in 1960.

Content
The album was released on the Liberty Records label in 1983. The catalogue number was LN-10204. The liner notes were written by Brian Setzer of the Stray Cats.

Track listing
Side 1
 "Summertime Blues"
 "Let's Get Together"
 "Long Tall Sally"
 "Pink-Peg Slacks"
 "C'mon Everybody"

Side 2
 "Twenty Flight Rock"
 "Hallelujah! I Love Her So"
 "Blue Suede Shoes"
 "Somethin' Else"
 "Skinny Jim"

Notes

Eddie Cochran albums
1983 compilation albums
Liberty Records albums